Monte Plata Batley Juan Sanchez Airport is located in Monte Plata, Dominican Republic.
This Airport receive some charter flights from other cities in the country.

Airlines and destinations
Servicios Aéreos Profesionales (Several Domestics Destinations) [charter]

See also
Monte Plata

Sources
Airports DR

Airports in the Dominican Republic
Buildings and structures in Monte Plata Province